Kim Jong-duck (born 4 June 1961) is a Korean professional golfer. 

Kim played on the Asia Golf Circuit in the mid-1990s, winning for the first time at the Maekyung Open in 1994. Victory in the Japan Golf Tour co-sanctioned Kirin Open in 1997 secured the Asian Tour's money list title and qualified him to play on the Japan Tour. He had three further wins in Japan between 1999 and 2004.

Professional wins (11)

Japan Golf Tour wins (4)

1Co-sanctioned by the Asia Golf Circuit

Japan Golf Tour playoff record (0–1)

Korean Tour wins (2)
1997 Elord Korea Open
2005 Shinhan Donghae Open

Asia Golf Circuit wins (2)
1994 Maekyung Open
1997 Kirin Open (also a Japan Golf Tour event)

Japan PGA Senior Tour wins (4)
2011 Fancl Classic, Japan PGA Senior Championship
2017 Komatsu Open
2018 Trust Group Cup Sasebo Senior Open Golf Tournament

Results in major championships

CUT = missed the halfway cut
Note: Kim only played in The Open Championship.

Team appearances
Alfred Dunhill Cup (representing South Korea): 1997, 1998

References

External links

South Korean male golfers
Japan Golf Tour golfers
1961 births
Living people